is an autobahn spur in Braunschweig. A proposed extension to the A 2 was deemed not feasible and will likely not be built.

Exit list 

|}

External links 

392
A392
Transport in Braunschweig